Greater Helsinki (Swedish: Helsingforsregionen, Storhelsingfors) is the metropolitan area surrounding Helsinki, the capital city of Finland. It includes the smaller Capital Region (Pääkaupunkiseutu, Huvudstadsregionen) urban area.

The smaller Capital Region consists of the central cities of Helsinki, Vantaa, Espoo, and Kauniainen and has a population of approximately  million. The Greater Helsinki region is the largest urbanised area in the country with  inhabitants and is by far the most important economic, cultural, and scientific region of Finland. Five out of Finland's 14 universities and most of the headquarters of notable companies and governmental institutions are located in Greater Helsinki, as is Finland's main airline hub and airport, Helsinki Airport, which is located in Vantaa.

These regions are located in the south of Finland, on the coast of the Gulf of Finland, which is part of the Baltic Sea. They area a part of the region of Uusimaa.

The term "Helsinki Metropolitan Area" and the other terms used are not firmly established and may vary in different contexts. Greater Helsinki is sometimes incorrectly called (the) Helsinki Region due to an incorrect direct translation of the Finnish and Swedish terms Helsingin seutu and Helsingforsregionen.

Terminology

Capital Region
In the strictest sense, the Finnish Capital Region consists of four municipalities with city title, Helsinki, Vantaa, Espoo and Kauniainen, whose total population is about 1.1 million (2014). This area is most often called the Capital region in English, Pääkaupunkiseutu in Finnish, and Huvudstadsregionen in Swedish, although the use of the terms is not especially consistent. The vast majority of the inhabitants live in the urban areas of the cities, but within the boundaries of these cities there are also suburban and rural areas.

Greater Helsinki
Commonly about ten more municipalities are considered to be part of Greater Helsinki, as they can be considered to be commuter towns and exurbs of Helsinki. When Hyvinkää, Järvenpää, Kerava, Kirkkonummi, Nurmijärvi, Sipoo, Tuusula, Mäntsälä, Pornainen and Vihti are included, the number of inhabitants rises to 1.4  million. All of the municipalities belong to the region of Uusimaa. Of these, Järvenpää, Kerava, Tuusula, Nurmijärvi, Sipoo, Kirkkonummi, Mäntsälä and Vihti have parts of the urban area within them. Additionally, the cities of Porvoo, Lohja, and to some extent Riihimäki, which have very close ties, motorway and (in the case of Riihimäki) commuter train accesses, and are fairly close to the capital, are nowadays often included in regional planning, which raises the total population to about 1,550,000.

Other definitions
As a part of the "Urban audit" project, Eurostat has attempted to standardise the concept of a 'metropolitan area'. According to this study the Metropolitan area of Helsinki consists of the kernel of Helsinki: Helsinki, Espoo, Vantaa, and Kauniainen. The Helsinki Larger Urban Area (Helsingin seutu in Finnish) consists of 12 cities and municipalities: the kernel of Helsinki and the aforementioned eight municipalities.

Statistics Finland define the commuter belt of Helsinki (Helsingin työssäkäyntialue, Helsingfors pendlingsområde) to include a total of 24 municipalities, with a land area of 7,359.80 km2 and a population of 1,431,108 as of 31 December 2007. In addition to that, there are people from as far as Lahti and even Tampere commuting to Helsinki daily.

Statistics Finland also defines the Helsinki urban area according to the official Finnish definion of an urban area ( in Finnish). The Helsinki urban area is the largest of its kind in Finland, and encompasses land throughout Greater Helsinki, with notable gaps around forests and other less-densely populated areas.

Statistics

The table below lists population, area, and population density for the largest municipalities of the Greater Helsinki area. (Note that "Helsinki Metropolitan Area" and the other terms used are not firmly established and may vary in different contexts.) The commuter towns of Lohja and Porvoo are not usually included, though, if they were (considering their proximity to Helsinki and their high commuting rate), they would raise the overall population above 1.5 million people. Hyvinkää, Järvenpää, Nurmijärvi, Tuusula, Mäntsälä and Pornainen, which have been designated as municipalities in Central Uusimaa in recent decades, have shown clear population growth due to their urban but also loose rural environment. These are also known as "Kuuma-kunnat" (literally means "hot municipalities").

See also
 Helsinki Metropolitan Area Libraries
 Metropolitan area
 Largest European metropolitan areas
 Largest metropolitan areas in the Nordic countries
 List of urban areas in the Nordic countries
 Largest urban areas of the European Union
 Helsinki urban area
 Greater Tampere

Notes

References

External links
ThisisFinland: Helsinki: A veritable mini-metropolis
HSL, Helsinki Regional Transport Authority

 
Helsinki
Geography of Helsinki
Sub-regions of Finland
Geography of Uusimaa